Helen of Sweden - Swedish: Helena or Elin - may refer to:

Helena (wife of Inge the Elder), Queen consort of Sweden around 1079
Helena Pedersdatter Strange, Queen consort of Sweden 1229
Helena of Sweden, Princess of Sweden (name not certain), 12th century Queen of Denmark
Helen, Princess of Sweden about 1190